Kenneth Leonard Norris (born 11 July 1931) is a British long-distance runner. He competed in the men's 10,000 metres at the 1956 Summer Olympics.  He was one of many signatories in a letter to The Times on 17 July 1958 opposing 'the policy of apartheid' in international sport and defending 'the principle of racial equality which is embodied in the Declaration of the Olympic Games'.

References

Sources
 Brown, Geoff and Hogsbjerg, Christian. Apartheid is not a Game: Remembering the Stop the Seventy Tour campaign. London: Redwords, 2020. .

External links
 

1931 births
Living people
Athletes (track and field) at the 1956 Summer Olympics
British male long-distance runners
Olympic athletes of Great Britain
Place of birth missing (living people)
Members of Thames Valley Harriers